Robo Shankar is an Indian standup comedian who has appears in character roles in Tamil films. He made his breakthrough with STAR Vijay's Kalakkapovathu Yaaru, performing standup comedy. He is a now cast as regular on several shows on Star Vijay and has presented television shows for the channel.

Career
Shankar was a mimicry artist when he was offered by Gokul a role in Rowthiram (2011); however, his scenes were edited out from the film. Gokul again cast him a role in Idharkuthane Aasaipattai Balakumara (2013), which gave him a break as an actor. After doing small roles in Yaaruda Mahesh and Kappal, Balaji Mohan cast Shankar in Vaayai Moodi Pesavum (2014). His performance was described by critics as "scream". He portrayed a negative character in Touring Talkies (2015). He then acted in Maari (2015), where his performance was mentioned by critics that he "deserves a special mention" and "steals the show with his unique one-liners and body language".

Personal life
His daughter Indraja made her acting debut in Bigil, as one of the women soccer players and also a castaway in Zee Tamil's Survivor Show.

Filmography

Actor
All films are in Tamil language unless otherwise noted.

Dubbing artist

Singer

Web series

Television

References

External links

Living people
Male actors from Madurai
Film producers from Tamil Nadu
Male actors in Tamil cinema
Tamil comedians
Indian male film actors
21st-century Indian male actors
Indian male comedians
Indian stand-up comedians
Year of birth missing (living people)